Absalom Willis Robertson (May 27, 1887 – November 1, 1971) was an American politician from Virginia who served over 50 years in public office. A member of the Democratic Party and lukewarm ally of the Byrd Organization led by fellow U.S. Senator Harry F. Byrd, Robertson represented Virginia in the U.S. House of Representatives (1933–1946) and the U.S. Senate (1946–1966), and had earlier served in the Virginia General Assembly. A member of the conservative coalition during his congressional career, Robertson was a vocal opponent of civil rights. Robertson was also the father of televangelist and political commentator Pat Robertson.

Early life and education
Robertson was born in Martinsburg, West Virginia, the son of Franklin Pierce Robertson and Josephine Ragland (née Willis), just two weeks before fellow Virginia Senator Harry F. Byrd was born in the same community. He graduated from the University of Richmond in 1907.

Early political and legal career

Robertson then established a private law practice and began his elective career. He was elected to the Virginia State Senate as a Democrat in 1915 to represent Bedford and Rockbridge counties and Buena Vista, Virginia, in Senate district 22, replacing W. T. Paxton, who had replaced J. Randolph Tucker in 1913. Robertson served from 1916 to 1922, when he resigned and was replaced by Samuel S. Lambeth Jr. in the February 1923 special session but Robert J. Noell won the election to succeed him later that year. During World War I, Robertson enlisted and served in the United States Army, but was assigned stateside so he could continue that part-time elective office.

Robertson served as Commonwealth Attorney for Rockbridge County, Virginia (an elective office per the Virginia constitution, which prohibited such officials from also serving as legislators or judges during their terms) from 1922 to 1928.

Federal political career
In 1932, Robertson was elected from Virginia's 7th congressional district to the U.S. House of Representatives, and was reelected six times.  In 1946, he won a special election for the right to complete the final two years of Senator Carter Glass's term and took office on the day after the election. He won the seat in his own right in 1948 and was reelected two more times without serious opposition.

Among his legislation is the Pittman–Robertson Federal Aid in Wildlife Restoration Act which creates the formula for federal sharing of ammunition tax revenues with states to establish wildlife areas. The program is still in effect and remains a primary financing source for wildlife areas.

Robertson was a typical member of the Byrd Organization, though differed at times and eventually became independent from the machine. He was chairman of the U.S. Senate Committee on Banking, Housing, and Urban Affairs from 1959 to 1966. In 1956, Robertson was one of the 19 senators who signed the Southern Manifesto against the U.S. Supreme Court decision of Brown v. Board of Education of Topeka (1954), which mandated schools' desegregation.

When President Lyndon B. Johnson sent his wife, Lady Bird Johnson, on a train trip through the South to encourage support for the Civil Rights Act of 1964 and the Voting Rights Act of 1965, Robertson was one of four Southern Senators who refused to meet with her on the whistle-stop trip.

In retaliation, President Johnson personally recruited Virginia State Senator William B. Spong Jr., a considerably more liberal Democrat, to run against Robertson in the 1966 Democratic primary. Even some Byrd Democrats had moved away from resistance to integration as espoused by Robertson and the Organization's patriarch, Harry F. Byrd. Meanwhile, the Civil Rights Act of 1964 had added black and lower-income voters. Spong defeated Robertson in the primary in one of the biggest upsets in Virginia political history. The Byrd Organization's long dominance of Virginia state politics had begun to end.

Opposition to civil rights

March 10, 1956, Christian Science Monitor
Asked to comment "on his region's state of mind and any specific American attitudes he feels are necessary to avoid violence and bring healing in a deteriorating situation following the Supreme Court school desegregation order," Robertson stated:

Virginia recognizes the correctness of the 1850 decision of the Massachusetts Supreme Court and in the 155 subsequent decisions of State and Federal courts holding that the equal rights provision of a constitution could be properly satisfied by public schools for the white and colored races which are separate but equal.

During the last 10 years notable progress has been made in the Southern States in meeting that equality requirement. But that progress will be nullified by a program of rapid, enforced desegregation. In fact, public education for both races in some Southern States would be destroyed.

The worst feature of the current desegregation effort, however, is the resulting bitterness and racial animosities in areas where harmony heretofore prevailed.  Southerners believe that the cherished constitutional right of every citizen to select his personal associates is being violated.

Monday, July 9, 1956, Congressional Record
I ask unanimous consent to have printed in the Congressional Record the weekly newsletter of my distinguished successor in the Seventh Congressional District of Virginia, Representative Burr P Harrison, in which he discussed the so-called civil rights bill now under consideration by the House. Representative Harrison's analysis is lucid and accurate, and I fully endorse the position he has taken in opposition to it.

Harrison had stated:

Even a casual reading of this bill, sponsored by the President, reveals it as one of the most drastic measures ever to receive consideration by the Congress.

It would set up a Federal Commission with a staff of snoopers who could roam the length and breadth of the United States, armed with subpoenas, looking for civil-rights incidents.  One of the objectives of this Commission would be to advance the idea of complete racial integration in private business.

Death
In 1971, Robertson died in Lexington, Virginia and was buried in Stonewall Jackson Memorial Cemetery, later renamed Oak Grove Cemetery.

His papers are held at the Swem Library at the College of William and Mary.

Electoral history
1934; Robertson was elected to the U.S. House of Representatives with 68.33% of the vote, defeating Republican J. Everett Will, Socialist Lester Ruffner, and Independent W.R. Eubank.
1936; Robertson was re-elected with 63.87% of the vote, defeating Republican Will and Socialist Ruffner.
1938; Robertson was re-elected with 63.87% of the vote, defeating Republican Charles C. Leap.
1940; Robertson was re-elected with 65.11% of the vote, defeating Republican Jacob A. Garber and now-Communist Ruffner.
1942; Robertson was re-elected unopposed.
1944; Robertson was re-elected with 59.87% of the vote, defeating Republican D. Wampler Earman.
1966; Robertson was defeated in a bid for re-election to the US Senate.

Footnotes

External links

 
 

1887 births
1971 deaths
20th-century American politicians
Civil rights movement
County and city Commonwealth's Attorneys in Virginia
Democratic Party members of the United States House of Representatives from Virginia
Democratic Party United States senators from Virginia
Members of Sons of Confederate Veterans
Old Right (United States)
People from Lexington, Virginia
Politicians from Martinsburg, West Virginia
American segregationists
Democratic Party Virginia state senators
University of Richmond alumni
20th-century American Episcopalians